Deer Harbor is an unincorporated community on Orcas Island in San Juan County, Washington, United States.  As with most San Juan Islands communities, Deer Harbor is known for its recreation and tourism, including kayaking, whale watching, and fishing. Many people fish for Dungeness crab, rock crab, and shrimp there.

Deer Harbor is assigned the ZIP code 98243.

External links

Deer Harbor Marina

Unincorporated communities in San Juan County, Washington
Unincorporated communities in Washington (state)